Edoardo Rovida (born 26 August 1927) is an Italian prelate of the Catholic Church who worked in the diplomatic service of the Holy See from 1953 to 2002.

Biography
Edoardo Rovida was born on 26 August 1927 in Alessandria, Italy, and was ordained a priest on 29 June 1950.

He completed the course of studies at the Pontifical Ecclesiastical Academy in 1953. 

He became known as a beneficiary of the patronage of Giovanni Benelli, who as Substitute of the Secretariat of State dominated the department from 1967 to 1977. His early assignments in the diplomatic service of the Holy See included a stint in Cuba during the early years of the Cuban Revolution.

On 31 July 1971, Pope Paul VI appointed him Titular Archbishop of Tauromenium and Apostolic Nuncio to Panama. He received his episcopal consecration on 10 October from Cardinal Jean-Marie Villot, the Secretary of State.

On 13 August 1977, he was appointed Apostolic Pro-Nuncio to Zaire and on 7 March 1981 was named  Permanent Observer of the Holy See to the United Nations in Geneva. 

On 26 January 1985, he was appointed Apostolic Nuncio to Switzerland and on 7 March 1987 Apostolic Nuncio to Liechtenstein. 

On 15 March 1993, he was appointed apostolic nuncio to Portugal.

His service as nuncio to Portugal ended with the appointment of his successor, Alfio Rapisarda, on 12 October 2002, but maintained the title nuncio.

Notes

See also
 List of heads of the diplomatic missions of the Holy See

References

1927 births
Living people
Apostolic Nuncios to Switzerland
Apostolic Nuncios to Liechtenstein
Apostolic Nuncios to Panama
Apostolic Nuncios to Portugal
Apostolic Nuncios to the Democratic Republic of the Congo
Permanent Observers of the Holy See to the United Nations
People from the Province of Alessandria
Pontifical Ecclesiastical Academy alumni